James A. Lake (born 1941) is an American evolutionary biologist.

Other people named James Lake include:
James Andrew Trehane Lake (1840–1876), lawyer, businessman and parliamentarian in South Australia
James Lake of the Lake baronets
 Jimmy Lake (born 1976), American football coach
James Lake may also refer to:
James Lake (Arkansas), a reservoir in Fulton County, Arkansas
James Lake (Ontario), a lake in Northeastern Ontario, Canada
Northland Pyrite Mine (also known as James Lake Mine), a mine at the James Lake in Ontario
Lake James (Indiana), a lake in northeastern Indiana, United States
Lake James, a reservoir in North Carolina, United States

See also
 Lake (surname)
 James (disambiguation)
 James River (disambiguation)

Lake, James